The following is a list of attractions that previously existed at the Sea World theme park on the Gold Coast, Queensland, Australia.

Rides and attractions

Shows

Marine attractions

Cancelled plans

References

Lists of former amusement park attractions